The Stillwater Public School District is located in Stillwater, Oklahoma, United States. The Stillwater school district has nine schools together with an alternative education program.

The district is managed by the Superintendent Uwe Gordon, who works under the direction of a five-person board.

The mascot of both the district and the high school is the Pioneers.

Schools

High school
 Stillwater High School (Grades 10–12)

Middle school
 Stillwater Junior High School (Grades 8–9)
 Stillwater Middle School (Grades 6–7)

Elementary schools
All elementary schools host grades pre-k through fifth grade.
 Highland Park Elementary School
 Richmond Elementary School
 Sangre Ridge Elementary School
 Skyline Elementary School
 Westwood Elementary School
 Will Rogers Elementary School

Alternative education
 Lincoln Academy

Shooting 
On 26 September 2012, a student died by a self-inflicted gunshot at Stillwater Junior High School.

Grade Reconfiguration Controversy 
In March 2013, then Superintendent Dr. Ann Caine presented the school board with the possibility of reconfiguring the grades to move fifth grade to the middle school, seventh grade to the junior high, and move ninth grade to the high school.  The district proposed these measures to assist with needed budgets cuts. Some parents opposed the reconfiguration and spending cuts, because the schedule change "would limit ...opportunities for concurrent enrollment" in a university town and "Teaching positions were being reduced instead of higher administration."

The acting Superintendent Dr. Ann Caine modified the plan to change the schedule change at the high school after students started a #KeepTheBlock Facebook page and change.org petition generated support in the community.

In November 2014, the Board voted to delay the reconfiguration due to needed building repairs and staffing concerns. In July 2015, after the retirement of Superintendent Dr. Ann Caine, the board delayed the reconfiguration, due to concerns about academics and renovations. Through 2015, the budget continued to be an issue, with the board making spending choices on repairs to athletics instead of funding the libraries and restoring funding that had been cut in previous budgetary crises.

References

External links
 

School districts in Oklahoma
Education in Payne County, Oklahoma